Hickory Creek is a stream in Daviess and Grundy counties of the U.S. state of Missouri. It is a tributary of the Thompson River.

The stream headwaters arise in Daviess County approximately 1.5 miles northeast of Jamesport adjacent to Missouri Route 6. The stream flows to the northeast and north parallel to the county line and turns to the southeast as it enters Grundy County. It flows past the community of Hickory Creek and enters the Thompson River about one mile north of the Grundy-Livingston county line.

Hickory Creek was named for the hickory timber lining its course.

See also
List of rivers of Missouri

References

Rivers of Daviess County, Missouri
Rivers of Grundy County, Missouri
Rivers of Missouri